Leslie Wilfred John Melia (September 10, 1929 – June 30, 1997) was a Canadian sprint canoer who competed in the late 1950s. At the 1956 Summer Olympics, he was eliminated in the heats of the K-2 1000 m event.

References

Leslie Melia's profile at Sports Reference.com

1929 births
Canadian male canoeists
Canoeists at the 1956 Summer Olympics
Olympic canoeists of Canada
1997 deaths